IROS, the IEEE/RSJ International Conference on Intelligent Robots and Systems, is an annual academic conference covering advances in robotics. It is one of the premier conferences of its field (alongside ICRA, International Conference on Robotics and Automation) with an 'A' rating from the Australian Ranking of ICT Conferences obtained in 2010 and an 'A1' rating from the Brazilian ministry of education in 2012.

The acceptance rate can vary substantially (for example, it has been 32% in 2011 and 39% in 2012) and IROS typically receives more than 2000 paper submissions (for example, 790 out of 2459 submitted papers have been accepted for IROS 2011).

Conferences 
 1st, IROS 1988, Tokyo, Japan (at Tokyo University of Science)
 2nd, IROS 1989, Tsukuba, Japan
 3rd, IROS 1990, Tsuchiura, Japan (at Hitachi MERL)
 4th, IROS 1991, Osaka, Japan
 5th, IROS 1992, Raleigh, USA
 6th, IROS 1993, Yokohama, Japan
 7th, IROS 1994, Munich, Germany
 8th, IROS 1995, Pittsburgh, USA
 9th, IROS 1996, Osaka, Japan
 10th, IROS 1997, Grenoble, France
 11th, IROS 1998, Victoria, Canada
 12th, IROS 1999, Kyonggju, Korea
 13th, IROS 2000, Takamatsu, Japan (at Kagawa University)
 14th, IROS 2001, Maui, USA
 15th, IROS 2002, Lausanne, Switzerland (at EPFL)
 16th, IROS 2003, Las Vegas, USA
 17th, IROS 2004, Sendai, Japan (at Tohoku University)
 18th, IROS 2005, Edmonton, Canada
 19th, IROS 2006, Beijing, China
 20th, IROS 2007, San Diego, USA
 21st, IROS 2008, Nice, France	　
 22nd, IROS 2009, St. Louis, USA　
 23rd, IROS 2010, Taipei, Taiwan
 24th, IROS 2011, San Francisco, USA	　
 25th, IROS 2012, Vilamoura, Portugal
 26th, IROS 2013, Tokyo, Japan
 27th, IROS 2014, Chicago, USA
 28th, IROS 2015, Hamburg, Germany
 29th, IROS 2016, Daejeon, Korea
 30th, IROS 2017, Vancouver, Canada
 31st, IROS 2018, Madrid, Spain
 32nd, IROS 2019, Macau, China
 33rd, IROS 2020, Las Vegas, USA, held virtually due to the COVID-19 pandemic
 34th, IROS 2021, Prague, Czech Republic, held virtually due to the COVID-19 pandemic
 35th, IROS 2022, Kyoto, Japan (at the Kyoto International Conference Center)

Planned Conferences 

 36th, IROS 2023, Detroit, USA
 37th, IROS 2024, Abu Dhabi, United Arab Emirates

References

Robotics organizations